Konux (stylised as KONUX) is a German AI/IoT (Internet of Things) company. It combines machine learning and Industrial IoT to deliver Software-as-a-Service (SaaS) solutions for operation, monitoring, and maintenance process automation. KONUX aims to make railway the number one mobility choice of tomorrow by increasing capacity, reliability, and cost efficiency. The company is headquartered in Munich, Germany, and is registered in Palo Alto, California, as an American corporation (Inc.).

History 
KONUX was founded in 2014 by Andreas Kunze, Dennis Humhal, Vlad Lata, and Maximilian Hasler. The four students from different disciplines had met at their alma mater, the Technical University of Munich (TUM), where they developed the basic idea of using sensor data to increase the availability of industrial facilities through predictive maintenance. Using a combination of sensors and artificial intelligence-based analytics software, they devised a system that can monitor facilities and thereby also predict maintenance needs. The founders focused on rail technology and, in their first application, specifically on switches.

For their project, they received initial funding (seed round) of $2 million from  Silicon Valley investors, led by Michael Baum, founder and CEO of the Big Data software company Splunk. Other investors included the Google investor, Andreas von Bechtolsheim, and the venture capitalist firm New Enterprise Associates (NEA). In three further financing rounds, KONUX has raised a total of over US$130 million to date. Later investors included MIG-Funds, and Athos, the family office of the Strüngmann brothers, which is also the largest shareholder of the biotechnology company BioNTech.

KONUX's IoT devices have been utilized on switches in Deutsche Bahn's high-speed network since 2015. They are intended to increase the availability of the track network and thus improve the punctuality of trains. At the beginning of 2020, KONUX was working for a total of ten international customers in Europe and Asia. In the same year, KONUX won a tender from Deutsche Bahn to monitor the condition of switches as critical elements of the rail infrastructure. In the initial phase of this project, the company completed the digitalization of more than 650 switches in mid-August 2021. The long-term framework agreement is Deutsche Bahn's first-ever cloud-based software-as-a-service (SaaS) infrastructure project.

In May 2021, KONUX co-founder and CEO Andreas Kunze stepped down from his position due to health reasons, but retained his seat on the company's board. His successors at the helm are KONUX co-founder and former CFO/COO Maximilian Hasler and Andreas Busemann, former CEO of Vossloh AG and manager at Deutsche Bahn and Siemens, who initially joined KONUX in January as a chief revenue officer. At the end of 2021, KONUX had around 120 employees.

Product 
The KONUX Predictive Maintenance System for Rail Switches is a software-as-a-service (SaaS) solution that uses IIoT devices and artificial intelligence to improve network capacity, reliability and cost efficiency. It continuously and autonomously monitors the condition of key switch components such as the track bed and frog. The KONUX system provides infrastructure managers with a forecast of how the condition of the switches will develop over time, enabling them to prevent failures and optimize their maintenance planning.

Recognition 

 June 2018 – CogX Award in the category "Outstanding Innovations with Artificial Intelligence in Sensor Technology"
 June 2017 – Presidential Entrepreneurship Award 2017 from the Technical University of Munich (TUM). 
 February 2017 – Technology pioneer, one of the 30 most important technology start-ups in the world, designated by the World Economic Forum (WEF).
 July 2016 – "The Spark - the German Digital Prize". The prize is awarded annually by business newspaper Handelsblatt and the management consultancy McKinsey.
 October 2016 – German Mobility Prize, the Federal Ministry of Transport and Digital Infrastructure.
2019 - Global deep tech investment firm Boundary Holding announced its investment in Konux.

References

Further reading 
 Industrial IoT and the age of predictive maintenance. Gaskell, Adi. Huffington Post. 14 November 2016. 
 Kraft des Neuen – Wie junge Unternehmer die Digitalisierung nutzen. Burfeind, Sophie und Dostert, Elisabeth. Süddeutsche Zeitung. 2 July 2017.
 Die Defekt-Vorherseher. Hubik, Franz. Handelsblatt. 29 April 2016.
 Die Eroberer der digitalen Mess-Welt. Köhn, Rüdiger. Frankfurter Allgemeine Zeitung. 18 April 2016.

External links 
 The company: KONUX GmbH 
 German Wikipedia

Privately held companies of Germany
German companies established in 2014